The Indianapolis ABCs were a Negro league baseball team that played from 1913 until 1926.

Indianapolis ABCs may also refer to:
Indianapolis ABCs (1931–1933), a Negro league baseball team that played from 1931 until 1933
St. Louis–New Orleans Stars, known as the Indianapolis ABCs in 1938
Atlanta Black Crackers, known as the Indianapolis ABCs in 1939